Alina Martain  (late 11th century–1125) was a French nun and saint.

She became a Benedictine nun at an early age. In 1105 Count William of Mortain built a convent of which Alina became the first superior. After a life of asceticism and voluntary mortification. Her feast day is October 20.

She does not appear in the index of the 2004 edition of the Roman Martyrology.

References

11th-century births
1125 deaths
12th-century French women
12th-century French people
12th-century Roman Catholics
Benedictine nuns